Max Tortora (born Massimiliano Tortora on 21 January 1963) is an Italian actor.

Biography
Very active on TV, Tortora began his career on stage in the 1980s, after graduating in Architecture. His most famous role is the role of the mechanic Ezio in the TV series I Cesaroni, from 2006 to 2014, and the co-pilot Max in Piloti. He also took part to several cinepanettoni by Carlo Vanzina.

On TV he alternates the roles of comedian, presenter and impressionist, giving impressions of characters like Alberto Sordi, Luciano Rispoli, Adriano Celentano, Franco Califano and Michele Santoro.

In 2018 Tortora takes part to the film On My Skin, based on the last days of Stefano Cucchi, playing the role of Cucchi's father, Giovanni. The film is presented at the 75th Venice Film Festival.

Selected filmography

Film
The Clan (2005)
Parents and Children: Shake Well Before Using (2010)
Natale in Sudafrica (2010)
A Fairy-Tale Wedding (2014)
Torno indietro e cambio vita (2015)
Miami Beach (2016)
Caccia al tesoro (2017)
Boys Cry (2018)
Loro (2018)
On My Skin (2018)
Bad Tales (2020, narrator)
Si vive una volta sola (2021)
Dry (2022)

TV
 Quelli che... il Calcio (2001-2002)
 I Cesaroni (2006-2014)
 Piloti (2007)
 Baby (2019-2020)

References

External links

1963 births
Living people
Italian film actors
Male actors from Rome